Reality-based community is a derisive term for people who base judgments on facts. It was first attributed to a senior official working for U.S. president George W. Bush by the reporter Ron Suskind in 2004. Many American liberals adopted the label for themselves, using it to portray themselves as adhering to facts in contradiction to conservatives presumed to be disregarding professional and scientific expertise.

Origin 
The phrase was attributed by journalist Ron Suskind to an unnamed official in the George W. Bush administration who used it to denigrate a critic of the administration's policies as someone who based their judgments on facts. In a 2004 article appearing in the New York Times Magazine, Suskind wrote:

International relations scholar Fred Halliday writes that the phrase reality-based community (in contrast to faith-based community) was used "for those who did not share [the Bush administration's] international goals and aspirations". Suskind has maintained his refusal to name the speaker, but the source of the quotation was widely speculated to be Bush's senior advisor Karl Rove.

Reactions 
Political scientist and former U.S. National Security Advisor Zbigniew Brzezinski characterized the encounter with the senior White House aide, as reported by Suskind, as exemplary of the "arrogance that swept the Bush White House". Journalist Steven Poole compared the phrase to Hannah Arendt's definition of totalitarian thinking, which she described as having "extreme contempt for facts".

Many American liberals adopted the term as a badge of honor. The words "[Proud to be a Member of the] Reality-Based Community" appeared on blogs and T-shirts. The term was used to mock the Bush administration's funding of faith-based social programmes, as well as a perceived hostility to professional and scientific expertise among American conservatives.

The quote in its entirety was prominently featured in the song "Walk It Back" from The National's 2017 album Sleep Well Beast, and Newsweek asked Rove and Suskind to comment on its inclusion. Rove denied being the speaker, stating that the quote itself was fictitious, and Suskind maintained both the veracity of the quote and his refusal to identify the source. Commentators have also drawn parallels between the 2004 quote and the rise of post-truth politics in the late 2010s.

See also
Alternative facts
Consensus reality
Fake news
Truthiness

References

Further reading
 
 
 
 

Political terminology
2000s neologisms
Presidency of George W. Bush